James Burton Goetz (May 28, 1936 – March 17, 2019) was a radio broadcaster and Minnesota Republican politician. He served as the 38th Lieutenant Governor of Minnesota from January 2, 1967, to January 4, 1971. He owned the KAGE radio station in Winona, Minnesota. Goetz was born in Freeport, Illinois. He lived in Naples, Florida with his wife and family. He died in Naples, Florida.

References

Lieutenant Governors of Minnesota
Minnesota Republicans
1936 births
2019 deaths
People from Freeport, Illinois
People from Naples, Florida
People from Winona, Minnesota
Radio personalities from Minnesota